James Morris North (August 11, 1919 – February 4, 2003) was an American football offensive lineman in the National Football League for the Washington Redskins. He played college football at Central Washington University. After his retirement from professional football, North coached at Mount Si High School in Snoqualmie, Washington.

His wife, Frances, served as a member of the Washington House of Representatives from 1973-83, and led campaigns to save Mount Si from development. She died in March 2003, one month after her husband.

References

1919 births
2003 deaths
People from Tukwila, Washington
Sportspeople from Washington (state)
American football offensive tackles
Washington Redskins players